The Chinese Cultural Renaissance or the Chinese Cultural Renaissance Movement was a movement promoted in Taiwan in opposition to the cultural destructions caused by the Chinese Communist Party during the Cultural Revolution.

Movement
Chiang Kai-shek, the then President of the Republic of China who launched the movement in November 1966 - on the 100th anniversary of Sun Yat-sen's birthday - by publicly announcing the official start of the renaissance movement.  It was the Kuomintang's first structured plan for cultural development on Taiwan.  Chiang himself was the head of the movement promotion council.  Future president Lee Teng-hui was also involved in the movement and served as the president for the cultural renaissance.

Chiang announced ten goals:

 To improve educational standards and promote family education with an emphasis on the Confucian principles of filial duty and fraternal love
 To reissue Chinese classic literary works and translate important works with a view toward disseminating Chinese culture abroad.
 To encourage the creation of new literary and art works that are relevant to contemporary society and informed by the ideals of the cultural renaissance
 To launch the government planning and construction of new theaters, opera houses, auditoriums, and art galleries, as well as stadiums throughout the country, and to improve existing facilities.
 To utilize all mass media for the promotion of the cultural renaissance with an emphasis upon encouraging good customs and morals.
 To guide the modernization of national life under the influence of the Confucian Principles of the "Four Social Controls" (propriety, rectitude, honesty and a sense of shame) and the "Eight Virtues" (Loyalty, filial piety, benevolence, love, faithfulness, justice, harmony and peace), a goal to be achieved with the help of the newly launched New Life Movement.
 To promote tourism and the preservation of historical relics
 To increase support for overseas Chinese education, including the publication of newspapers and the promotion of cultural activities abroad.
 To maintain close ties with foreign institutions and intellectuals, particularly those whose research focuses on China.
 To revise tax statutes and regulations in order to encourage wealthy individuals, private industries, and private businesses to make donations to government-endorsed cultural and educational establishments.

See also

 History of the Kuomintang cultural policy
 May Fourth Movement
 Zoulu (culture)

References

Chinese literary movements
1966 establishments in Taiwan